Coffman is an unincorporated community in Saline Township in southern Sainte Genevieve County, Missouri, United States. It is located approximately fifteen miles southwest of Ste. Genevieve.

History
A post office called Coffman was established in 1875, and remained in operation until 1942. The community of Coffman was named after John Coffman, a nearby landowner, native of Virginia and one of Missouri's largest slave holders. An earlier settlement, called New Tennessee, was located near Coffman and had been founded by Protestant American settlers, many hailing from Tennessee.

Community
Coffman is home to the Crown Valley Brewing & Distilling Co. microbrewery  as well as the 165 acre Crown Valley Winery.

References

Unincorporated communities in Ste. Genevieve County, Missouri
Unincorporated communities in Missouri